Linas ( or ) is a commune in the Essonne department in Île-de-France in northern France.

The famous motor racing circuit Autodrome de Linas-Montlhéry (often abbreviated as "Montlhéry") is located across the communes of Linas, Bruyères-le-Châtel and Ollainville.

Population

Inhabitants of Linas are known as Linois in French.

See also
Communes of the Essonne department

References

External links

Official website 

Mayors of Essonne Association 

Communes of Essonne